Robert T. "Longie" Powell (June 13, 1917 – July 2, 1980) was an American professional basketball player. He played for the Dayton Rens in the National Basketball League during the 1948–49 season and averaged 5.0 points per game. He also played for the Harlem Globetrotters, New York Renaissance, and the Chicago Colored Collegians.

References

1917 births
1969 deaths
African-American basketball players
American men's basketball players
Basketball players from Mississippi
Centers (basketball)
Dayton Rens players
Forwards (basketball)
Harlem Globetrotters players
New York Renaissance players
Basketball players from Gary, Indiana
20th-century African-American sportspeople